Chingiz Mustafayev (born 11 March 1991) is an Azerbaijani singer, songwriter, and guitarist. He represented Azerbaijan in the Eurovision Song Contest 2019 with the song "Truth", finishing in eighth place.

Early life 
Mustafayev was born in Moscow and moved to his parents' native Qazax, Azerbaijan when he was six years old. He learned to play the guitar and started composing his own songs while still a young boy.

Career 
At age 13, he moved with his mother and his brother to Baku where he auditioned for the Azerbaijani version of Pop Idol in 2007. Mustafayev won the competition, and soon became a rising star in the Azerbaijani music industry. In 2013, he represented Azerbaijan internationally in the New Wave competition in Jūrmala, Latvia. He placed 11th overall and sang along with Polina Gagarina. Three years later, Mustafayev auditioned for the sixth season of The Voice of Ukraine, however he was eliminated in the subsequent Battle Round. Since then, Chingiz has performed with his group Palmas, which meld traditional Azerbaijani and Turkish folk sounds with flamenco guitar, rock, and pop twists. In early 2019, Chingiz released the single "Tənha gəzən".

On 8 March 2019, it was confirmed that Chingiz would represent Azerbaijan in the Eurovision Song Contest 2019 with the song "Truth". He performed in the second semi-final on 16 May 2019 in Tel Aviv, Israel as 18th, closing the semi-final. He placed 5th with 224 points, thus qualifying for the grand final on 18 May 2019. In the final, he placed 8th in a field of 26 participants with 302 points.

Discography

Singles

References

Living people
1991 births
Musicians from Baku
People from Qazax
21st-century Azerbaijani male singers
Azerbaijani pop singers
The Voice of Ukraine contestants
Eurovision Song Contest entrants for Azerbaijan
Eurovision Song Contest entrants of 2019
Azerbaijani nationalists